This is a list of episodes from the sixth season of Shark Tank.

Episodes

Nick Woodman, creator of the GoPro camera, appeared as a guest shark in two episodes this season.

References

External links 
 Official website
 

6
2014 American television seasons
2015 American television seasons